New Lisbon is an unincorporated community in Jackson Township, Randolph County, in the U.S. state of Indiana.

History
New Lisbon was laid out in 1848, and was named after Lisbon, in Portugal.

Geography

Cemeteries

The New Lisbon Cemetery is located in Jackson Township on the southwest corner of the intersection of County Roads 800 East and 550 North. There is an old and new (1893) section for this cemetery, located on both sides of County Road 800 East. Some of the stones are written in German. The old cemetery is a short distance south of the new one, and on the other (the east) side of the highway.

References

Unincorporated communities in Randolph County, Indiana
Unincorporated communities in Indiana